Don Stuart Shondell (January 1, 1929 – November 23, 2021) was the patriarch of one of the best known families in American volleyball. His career was long and varied as a volleyball coach, author and program coordinator. He has a career record of 769–280–6 (.732), affording him the second highest number of wins in NCAA men's volleyball history, behind UCLA's Al Scates.

Coaching
Shondell graduated from Ball State University in 1952 and started Ball State's men's volleyball program in 1964. Shondell took a leave from the program in 1965 to complete a doctoral program at Indiana University. As head coach of Ball State's men's volleyball program, he won 20 Midwest Intercollegiate Volleyball Association (MIVA) titles in 34 seasons. In 1970, he led Ball State to the first NCAA Men's Volleyball Championship tournament. He later earned twelve more NCAA berths. Among his former players are Olympian Phil Eatherton and Walton. 

Shondell was a co-founder of the MIVA, the organization's first president, and an eight-time MIVA coach of the year winner.

He retired as head coach of Ball State in 1998 and was replaced by Joel Walton, a former player and assistant coach. After retirement Shondell began coaching the Middle School volleyball team at Muncie Burris Laboratory School in Muncie, Indiana. He also coached youth volleyball in the Muncie area.

Other works
Shondell was the co-author and editor of the Volleyball Coaching Bible.

Personal life
Shondell was the father of Dave Shondell, the present head women's volleyball head coach at Purdue University, John Shondell, who is Dave's assistant at Purdue, and Steve Shondell, the former girls' volleyball coach at Muncie Burris High School where he accumulated over 1,000 wins. Steve has since moved on to take the head coaching position for the Ball State women's volleyball team. 

Shondell was also the grandfather of former Tennessee women's player and current Youngstown State assistant coach Jasmine Fullove, former Purdue women's player Lindsay Shondell, and current Butler head coach Kyle Shondell.

Shondell died on November 23, 2021.

References 

1929 births
2021 deaths
American volleyball coaches
Volleyball coaches from Indiana
Sportspeople from Muncie, Indiana
Ball State University alumni
Indiana University alumni
Ball State Cardinals men's volleyball coaches